Fotukava "Hiko" Malu (born December 2, 1993) is an American rugby league footballer who plays for the Atlanta Rhinos and has played rugby union for the Atlanta Renegades. He was selected to represent the United States in the 2017 Rugby League World Cup.

Playing career
He was part of the Atlanta Rhinos premiership winning team in 2017, where he also won MVP for the match.

He was selected to represent the United States in the 2017 Rugby League World Cup.

References

External links
Atlanta Rhinos profile
Atlanta Renegades profile
2017 RLWC profile

1993 births
Living people
American rugby union players
American Samoan rugby league players
Atlanta Rhinos players
Rugby league second-rows
United States national rugby league team players